Påryd is a locality situated in Kalmar Municipality, Kalmar County, Sweden with 651 inhabitants in 2010. It is home to the "Pårydsskolan" Elementary School and an outdoor heated public pool open during the season.  Behind the outdoor pool are 3 hiking (cross country skiing) trails of varying distance that are marked and lit until 10pm.  The head parish church for the Karlslunda parish is located here also

Recently TeliaSonera has offered to the community to lay fiber optic cables for access to high speed internet services with 1000 mbs capable lines to each of the homes, which has been accepted by over 50% of the homeowners.  Plans are underway to complete this by December 2015.

In the village, there is an automated 24/7 Preem gas station and at the same location a pizzeria called Milano.  The village also is home to an ICA Nara grocery store, a library open a few days a week, and a hardware and gardening machine (mowers, trimmers, etc.) repair shop.

The woodworking company Elfverson & Co., which used to manufacture wooden bobbins (used in sewing machines and thread) and the Kalmartrissan yo-yo, is located in Påryd.  Nowadays, they produce high quality wooden caps and tops for high end whiskey and tequila brands in the UK and USA.

It is also the home of the Påryd Lantcafe, a quaint, small restaurant that serves dishes that are a fusion of traditional Swedish meals with some international flavors mixed in, all concocted by it' creative chef, Christian.

References

External links

Populated places in Kalmar County
Populated places in Kalmar Municipality